Coal Township is a township in Vernon County, in the U.S. state of Missouri.

Coal Township was erected in 1856, and named for local deposits of coal.

References

Townships in Missouri
Townships in Vernon County, Missouri